Composition with Red, Blue and Yellow is a 1930 painting by Piet Mondrian, a Dutch artist who was a leading figure in the Neo-Plasticism movement. It consists of thick, black brushwork, defining the borders of colored rectangles. As the title suggests, the only colors used in it besides black and white are red, blue, and yellow. The piece is very similar to Mondrian's 1930 Composition II in Red, Blue,  and Yellow. According to Dr. Stephanie Chadwick, associate professor of art history at Lamar University, "Mondrian's Composition with Red, Blue, and Yellow demonstrates his commitment to relational opposites, asymmetry, and pure planes of color. Mondrian composed this painting as a harmony of contrasts that signifies both balance and the tension of dynamic forces."

References

External links
 Entry on Composition with Red, Blue and Yellow on the online collection of the Kunsthaus Zürich.

Paintings by Piet Mondrian
Abstract art
1930 paintings